The Battle of Wadi al-Laban, also Battle of Oued el Leben, معركة وادي اللبن occurred in March–April 1558 between Saadians and Turkish-Algerian forces under Hasan Pasha, the son of Hayreddin Barbarossa and occurred north of Fes, at Wadi al-Laban ("The riverbed of milk" or "The riverbed of yoghurt"), an affluent of the Sebou River, one day north of Fes.

Background 
This conflict took place in a context of tensions between Algeria and Morocco. until the return of the Saadian Mohammed ash-Sheikh to power. Following the return of the Saadians, numerous conflicts broke out between  Algeria and Morocco, which tried to annex the Algerian city of Tlemcen.

The conflict was initiated when the Moroccan ruler Mohammed ash-Sheikh refused to give allegiance to the Ottomans and the alliance he concluded with the Spaniards. Hasan Pasha, the son of Barbarossa, was named by the Ottoman Empire beylerbey of the Regency of Algiers in June 1557, in order to continue the fight against the Moroccan ruler. He had Mohammed ash-Sheikh assassinated in October 1557 by one of his bodyguards.

Battle 
The Ottoman turks who were backing the Wattasid sent an invasion force into Morocco led by the ruler of Algiers Hasan Pasha, the son of khizr barbarossa, then he conquered Fes in  September 1554. An indecisive battle between the two sides took place in Wadi al-Laban to the north of Fez, after which, Hasan Pasha decided to retreat upon hearing of Spanish preparations for an offensive from Oran in Western Algeria. He embarked with his troops at the port of Qassasa in northern Morocco, just west of Melilla, and from there sailed to Algiers to prepare a defense against the Spaniards, who soon attacked in the Mostaganem expedition. Other sources attribute a victory to either Hassan or Abdallah.

Aftermath

Abdallah al-Ghalib later sent an expedition against Tlemcen in 1560 but it was defeated. Despite his initial opposition against the Ottomans, later during his reign Abdallah al-Ghalib was forced to pay an annual tribute of vassalage to the Ottomans therefore establishing Ottoman influence on the entire Maghreb.

See also
Conflicts between Ottoman Algeria and Morocco
Morocco-Ottoman relations

Notes

Wadi al-Laban
Wadi al-Laban
Wadi al-Laban
Suleiman the Magnificent
1558 in the Ottoman Empire
16th century in Morocco
16th century in Algeria
1558 in Africa